The Buffalo River Bridge was a historic bridge, carrying Arkansas Highway 7 across the Buffalo River in northeastern Newton County, Arkansas. It was located in the Buffalo National River, managed by the National Park Service. The central truss was flanked at the ends by eight-panel Warren trusses. The bridge was built in 1931 by a Kansas contractor under contract to the state highway department. At the time of its listing on the National Register of Historic Places in 1990, it was one of four known Pennsylvania through trusses in the state. It was delisted in 2022 following demolition that began in 2021.

See also
List of bridges documented by the Historic American Engineering Record in Arkansas
List of bridges on the National Register of Historic Places in Arkansas
National Register of Historic Places listings in Newton County, Arkansas

References

External links

Historic American Engineering Record in Arkansas
Road bridges on the National Register of Historic Places in Arkansas
Bridges completed in 1931
Demolished buildings and structures in Arkansas
National Register of Historic Places in Newton County, Arkansas
Pennsylvania truss bridges in the United States
National Register of Historic Places in Buffalo National River
Former National Register of Historic Places in Arkansas
1931 establishments in Arkansas
2021 disestablishments in Arkansas
Transportation in Newton County, Arkansas
Former road bridges in the United States